The  Vorarlbergliga is the highest football league of the Austrian state of Vorarlberg. It's the fourth highest football league in Austria. Exclusively limited to teams of the Vorarlberg Football Association (VFV).

Vorarlbergliga was part of the 4th highest level which called Austrian Landesliga. However, inside Vorarlberg state, Landesliga was the name of the fifth-tier which teams of Vorarlbergliga relegated to.

Mode
The league consists of 16 teams. In each season, each club plays against each other club in one home and one away match. A season is therefore made up of 30 games.

The champion of the Vorarlbergliga is entitled to move up to the third-tier, the Regionalliga West. If the champion refuses the promotion, this can lead to a relegation from the league, which has been implicated since the 2011–12 season. The number of teams that descend directly into the fifth class the Landesliga, depends on the number of teams from Vorarlberg which descend from the Regionalliga West. Every season, at least one club moves up. On the other hand, every year two teams move down directly to the Vorarlbergliga. In addition, since the 2014–15 season, at the end of the championship a relegation between the third placed team of the Landesliga and the lowest ranked non relegated team from the Vorarlbergliga is held. Relegation consists of a home and away game.

2020–21 member clubs 

SC Admira Dornbirn
FC Alberschwende
FC Andelsbuch
VfB Bezau
FC Bizau
FC Blau-Weiss Feldkirch
FC Egg
SC Fussach
SC Göfis
FC Hard
FC Höchst
SV Lochau
SV Ludesch
FC Lustenau 07
FC Nenzing
FC Schruns

References

Football competitions in Austria
Football in Austria